État Libre d'Orange is a French brand of perfumes created in 2006 by Etienne de Swardt. The fragrance company created for the brand is Editions des Sens.

Etymology
In French, the Etat Libre d'Orange is the name of the Orange Free State, an independent Boer sovereign republic in southern Africa during the second half of the 19th century, and later a British colony and a province of the Union of South Africa.

Visual identity 
The logo is a blue-white-red cockade over a white disc.

Every flask is identical, the only variant being the name, surrounding the logo.

References

External links
 Official site
 "Etat Libre d’Orange Is Making a Luxury Perfume out of Trash and Worms." Adweek. April 9, 2018. Retrieved July 21, 2018.

Chemical companies established in 2006
Perfumes